The 1931–32 Egypt Cup was the 11th edition of the Egypt Cup.

The final was held on 6 May 1932. The match was contested by Al Ahly and Zamalek, with Zamalek winning 2–1.

Quarter-finals

Semi-finals

Final

References 

 

3
Egypt Cup
1931–32 in Egyptian football